The 19th Nova Scotia general election may refer to:

Nova Scotia general election, 1851, the 19th general election to take place in the Colony of Nova Scotia, for the 19th General Assembly of Nova Scotia
1941 Nova Scotia general election, the 41st overall general election for Nova Scotia, for the (due to a counting error in 1859) 42nd Legislative Assembly of Nova Scotia, but considered the 19th general election for the Canadian province of Nova Scotia